Rydell may refer to:

Rydell (name)
Rydell National Wildlife Refuge, National Wildlife Refuge in Minnesota, U.S.
Rydell High School, fictional school in the 1971 musical Grease

See also